The National Park Service Organic Act, or simply "the Organic Act" within the National Park Service, conservationists, etc., is a United States federal law that established the National Park Service (NPS), an agency of the United States Department of the Interior. The Act was signed into law on  August 25, 1916, by President Woodrow Wilson. It is codified in Title 54 of the United States Code.

The National Park Service established by the Act "shall promote and regulate the use of the
Federal areas known as national parks, monuments, and reservations
hereinafter specified by such means and measures as conform to the
fundamental purpose of the said parks, monuments, and reservations,
which purpose is to conserve the scenery and the natural and historic
objects and the wild life therein and to provide for the enjoyment of
the same in such manner and by such means as will leave them unimpaired
for the enjoyment of future generations".

The act was sponsored by Representative William Kent (I) of California and Senator Reed Smoot (R) of Utah. First NPS Director Stephen Mather was put in charge of supervising and maintaining all designated national parks, battlefields, historic places, and monuments.

National parks began to be designated in the second half of the 19th century, and national monuments in the early part of the 20th century.  Each park or monument was managed individually or, alternately in some cases, by the United States Army, each with varying degrees of success. Beginning in 1911, Smoot and Representative John E. Raker of California had submitted bills to establish the National Park Service to oversee the management of all these holdings. The bills were opposed by the director of the U.S. Forest Service, Gifford Pinchot, and his supporters. The Forest Service believed that a National Park Service would be a threat to continued Forest Service control of public lands that had been set aside for the timber trade. Beginning in 1910 the American Civic Association with the support of the General Federation of Women's Clubs and the Sierra Club had led the call for a federal service to manage the parks. The noted landscape architect and planner Frederick Law Olmsted, Jr. was also a booster of a single national organization to manage the National Parks.

Successful and influential industrialist Stephen Mather was challenged by Interior Secretary Franklin K. Lane to lobby for legislation creating a bureau to oversee the National Parks. Mather accepted pro bono (accepting a perfunctory salary of $1) and with assistance primarily by a young lawyer named Horace Albright a campaign was begun. By 1915, regular meetings were occurring at Kent's home in Washington. The group’s regulars were Kent, J. Horace McFarland of the American Civic Association, and the few Washington staff members of the Department of the Interior responsible the National Parks.

See also
 History of the National Park Service

References

External links
 Robin W. Winks, The National Park Service Act of 1916: "A Contradictory Mandate"?, 74 Denv. U. L. Rev. 575 (1997).
 

1916 in the environment
1916 in American law
National Park Service
United States federal public land legislation